Theodore J. "Ted" Lowi (July 9, 1931 – February 17, 2017) was an American political scientist. He was the John L. Senior Professor of American Institutions teaching in the Government Department at Cornell University. His area of research was the American government and public policy. He was a member of the core faculty of the Cornell Institute for Public Affairs.

Biography
Theodore J. Lowi was born on July 9, 1931 in Gadsden, Alabama. He and his wife, Angele, reared two children, Anna and Jason. He made his home in Ithaca, New York. Lowi obtained a Bachelor of Arts from Michigan State University in 1954, and a Master of Arts and Ph.D. from Yale University in New Haven, Connecticut, in 1955 and 1961, respectively.  He served as president of the American Political Science Association (APSA), in 1991, and as president of the International Political Science Association, from 1997 to 2000.

In a poll of the APSA membership in 1978 he was named the most influential political scientist in the United States. In a membership survey of the Political Organizations and Parties section of the APSA in 1990, he was one of 40 scholars mentioned four or more times, among the total 137 scholars cited by the 265 respondents, as having a major influence on their research area. Lowi was a frequent guest on NPR, PBS, and cable television news-issues talk shows.

Honors
Honorary degree, University of Pavia, 2008.
Wilbur Lucius Cross Medal, Yale Graduate School of Arts and Sciences, 2013.

Published work
At the Pleasure of the Mayor: Patronage and Power in New York City, 1898–1958 (New York, 1964)
Legislative Politics, U.S.A. (ed.) (Boston; 1962, 1965, 1974)
The Pursuit of Justice (co-authored with Robert F. Kennedy) (New York, 1964)
The End of Liberalism: The Second Republic of the United States (W.W. Norton 1969,1979). From dust jacket: "The main argument which Lowi develops through both editions is that the liberal state grew to its immense size and presence without self-examination and without recognizing that its pattern of growth had problematic consequences.  Its engine of growth was delegation.  The government expanded by responding to the demands of all major organized interests, by assuming responsibility for programs sought by those interests, and by assigning that responsibility to administrative agencies.  Through the process of accommodation, the agencies became captives of the interest groups, a tendency Lowi describes as clientelism.  This in turn led to the formulation of new policies which tightened the grip of interest groups on the machinery of government."
The Politics of Disorder (New York, 1971, 1974)
Poliscide: Scientists, the Giant Accelerator and the Metropolis (et alia) (New York, 1975, 1990)
American Government: Incomplete Conquest (New York, 1976, 1977, 1981)
Nationalizing Government: Public Policies in America (et alia) (Beverly Hills, 1978)
The Personal President: Power Invested, Promise Unfulfilled (Ithaca, 1985)
American Government: Freedom & Power (with Benjamin Ginsburg) (New York, 1990, 1994)
Democrats Return to Power: Politics and Policy in the Clinton Era(with Benjamim Ginsburg)(New York, 1994)
The End of the Republican Era (1995)
 "American Business, Public Policy, Case-Studies, and Political Theory" (1964), World Politics 16(4):677–715. In this journal article, which reviews a book by Raymond A. Bauer, Ithiel de Sola Pool, and Lewis A. Dexter, Lowi lays out his classic typology of public policy in the U.S.:  distribution, regulation, and redistribution. This typology was meant to help political scientists and policy scholars build theories of policy making that could be generalized beyond particular issue areas. Distributive policies, aka "pork barrel" programs, distribute resources from the government to particular recipients; the winners are concentrated but the losers (those who ultimately pay for the distribution) are diffuse.  Regulatory policies are aimed at groups or classes of targets, rather than individuals, and they typically raise costs for the targets (in which case the costs are concentrated). Redistributive policies transfer resources from one class or group to another. A fourth category of policy named by Lowi is the constituent.
 "Hyperpolitics. A Interactive Dictionary of Politica Science" (2010), with Mauro Calise, Chicago, Chicago University Press
 American Government: Power and Purpose (2012)
 "Concetti Chiave. Capire la Scienza politica" (2016), co-editor with Mauro Calise and Fortunato Musella, Bologna, Il Mulino
 " We The People 11th edition" (2017)

See also
 Interest group liberalism

References

External links
 Cornell website
 Past Presidents of the APSA

1931 births
2017 deaths
Cornell University faculty
Michigan State University alumni
Yale Graduate School of Arts and Sciences alumni
People from Gadsden, Alabama
International Political Science Association scholars
Scientists from Ithaca, New York